Talgat Damirovich Batalov (born May 4, 1987, Tashkent) is a  Uzbekistani  and Russian theater director and actor. Multiple nominee for the Golden Mask Award.

Biography
Talgat was born in Tashkent; his father was an artist, his mother an engineer.

He studied at the Uzbekistan State Institute of Arts and Culture on  faculty of directing film, theater and TV. He worked in the Ilkhom Theatre governed by  Mark Weil, and, in particular, he directed the video series staged by Weill Oresteia.
In 2007, he moved to Moscow, studied at the VGIK at the scenario faculty (workshop of Rustam Ibragimbekov).

Since 2009, regularly collaborates with the Moscow .

Talgat Batalov is a member of various theater laboratories in Moscow, Yaroslavl, Tashkent, etc.

References

External links
 Правила режиссёра: Талгат Баталов
  'Uzbek' Shows Moscow Through Immigrants' Eyes, The Moscow Times, John Freedman

1987 births
Living people
Uzbekistani theatre directors
Russian theatre directors
Uzbekistani male stage actors
Russian male stage actors
Actors from Tashkent